Kottayi-II  is a village in the Palakkad district, state of Kerala, India. Kottayi-II and Kottayi-I come under the Kottayi gram panchayat. Kottayi is one of the oldest village of this area and Kandathar kavu is the most popular temple .

Demographics
 India census, Kottayi-II had a population of 8,831 with 4,214 males and 4,617 females.

References

Villages in Palakkad district